Worsley Court House is a conference and weddings venue in Worsley, Greater Manchester, England. Built in 1849 for Francis Egerton, 1st Earl of Ellesmere as the local manor court, it was later used as a magistrates' court. In 1966 it was granted Grade II listed status.

History

Worsley Court House was built in 1849 as the local manor court. After 1888 it became a magistrates' court. Early in its history it was used for night classes and is now the village hall.

The courthouse was sold to Worsley Urban District Council in 1966 and was extended the following year. In 1974 ownership passed to Salford City Council.

Architecture

The courthouse is timber framed on a projecting stone plinth and has a slate roof. The studded framing has square panelling in its gables. The building centres around the large hall with tall gables surrounded by lower single-storey rooms. The gables have decorative bargeboards and finials. The doorway has a Tudor arched surround and a studded door. A ground-floor loggia with a balustrade forms a porchway.

See also

 Listed buildings in Worsley

References

External links
 Worsley Court House 

Grade II listed buildings in the City of Salford
Buildings and structures completed in 1849
Tourist attractions in Salford